Mohamed Mahmoud Ali Ahmed (born 7 May 1998), is an Egyptian footballer who plays as a midfielder for the Egyptian national team and the Egyptian Premier League side Al Ittihad Alexandria on loan from Al Ahly.

References

1998 births
Living people
Egyptian footballers
Association football midfielders
Wadi Degla SC players
Egyptian Premier League players
Al Ahly SC players